is a Japanese professional racing driver who competes in the FIA World Endurance Championship for Toyota Gazoo Racing (GR) and in the Super Formula Championship for KCMG . He previously competed in Formula One, Formula E, the GP2 Series, and the GP2 Asia Series (which he won). Kobayashi is the 2019–20 and 2021 World Endurance champion along with his team-mates Mike Conway and José María López. He is the Third FIA world champion from Japan after Toshi Arai and Kazuki Nakajima. He won the 2021 24 Hours of Le Mans driving for Toyota Gazoo Racing.

Racing career

Early career
Kobayashi was born in Amagasaki, near Kobe. His father owns a sushi restaurant. He began his career in motorsport in 1996 when he was nine years old, finishing third in his first season of karting in the SL Takarazuka Tournament Cadet Class. During the following seven years, Kobayashi took four karting titles, winning the Toyota SL All Japan Tournament Cadet Class series twice.

In 2004, he signed for Toyota's Driver Academy and soon began his career in open wheel racing. His next step was Formula Renault, entering the Asian, German, Italian and Dutch championships and taking two race victories in the Italian championship. Kobayashi continued in the Formula Renault class, entering the Italian and European championships and with six wins in both championships, he won both titles.

In 2006, Kobayashi entered the Formula 3 Euro Series with ASM Formule 3 alongside Paul di Resta, Giedo van der Garde and Sebastian Vettel. He took three podium positions in his debut season, coming eighth in the Drivers' Championship and first in the Rookie's Championship. Kobayashi also entered the Macau Grand Prix and the Masters of Formula 3, which are annual Formula Three events. Kobayashi started in 10th place and finished the race a place lower in 11th, while at the Macau Grand Prix, he started the race in pole position but finished in 19th place.

At the beginning of 2007, Kobayashi, along with Kohei Hirate, was named as one of the Toyota Formula One team's test drivers. He stayed in the Euro Series for the upcoming season and had an impressive start, taking two podiums in the first four rounds. He achieved his first race victory in Formula 3 at Magny-Cours, in the tenth round, a support race for the Formula One French Grand Prix. Kobayashi finished fourth in the Drivers' Championship.

GP2

Following a successful GP2 Asia Series campaign in early 2008, Kobayashi won his first GP2 Series race in only the second race of the season. After a strong start from pole in the sprint race at the Circuit de Catalunya, Kobayashi took the chequered flag in first place. This was after a controversial piece of defensive driving from his former Euro Series teammate Romain Grosjean after a safety car period. At the end of the pit straight, Kobayashi attempted a pass on Grosjean. However, the Frenchman moved more than once to defend his position, forcing Kobayashi into evasive action. This resulted in a drive through penalty for the Frenchman, handing the win to Kobayashi. However, he only finished in the points on one further occasion, restricting him to sixteenth in the championship.

Another successful GP2 Asia campaign followed over the winter months of 2008 and 2009, with Kobayashi winning two races en route to the championship, with a round to spare. Kobayashi could not repeat his form in the main series, finishing sixteenth again.

Formula One (2007–2012)
On November 16, 2007, it was confirmed that Kobayashi would replace the departing Franck Montagny as the Toyota F1 team's third driver.

Toyota (2009)

2009
At the 2009 Japanese Grand Prix, Kobayashi competed in the first two free practice sessions in place of Timo Glock, who was ill. Glock recovered in time to take part in the third free practice session and qualifying, but was injured after crashing in the final session and had to miss the race. Toyota asked the Fédération Internationale de l'Automobile (FIA) for permission to run Kobayashi in the race, but this was refused as the regulations state a driver must run in at least one session on Saturday to be eligible to start the race.

Kobayashi made his Formula One debut at the 2009 Brazilian Grand Prix, following a complication to Glock's injury that was initially not detected. He qualified 11th in a chaotic session that lasted for over two and half hours and was red-flagged twice due to accidents caused by torrential rain. Early in the race, while running in sixth place, he held off for several laps a challenge by Jenson Button, who needed to finish well to clinch the world championship. He finished the race in tenth place, and was later promoted to ninth when Heikki Kovalainen was penalised. Button jokingly described Kobayashi as "absolutely crazy, very aggressive". He also competed in the 2009 Abu Dhabi Grand Prix, as Glock's injury had not healed sufficiently. Kobayashi qualified 12th and finished sixth, scoring his first World Championship points, in the inaugural day-night race in Abu Dhabi.
Before Toyota decided to withdraw from Formula One, Kobayashi was expected to be given a full-time seat at Toyota for the 2010 Formula One Season.

Sauber (2010–2012)

2010

Following Toyota's withdrawal, Kobayashi faced an uncertain future, but he was mentioned in lists of probable drivers for the series' new teams for 2010. After weeks of speculation, it was confirmed on December 17, 2009, he would drive for Sauber for the 2010 season. Despite the team having been sold by BMW back to founder Peter Sauber after the 2009 season, and no longer using BMW components, the team was still named BMW Sauber as it had been known for the past four seasons. His teammate was former McLaren tester Pedro de la Rosa. Kobayashi completed his first laps in the new Sauber C29 chassis during F1 winter testing on 2 February.

In the next race in Malaysia he qualified in ninth place, his best grid position up to that point, however he suffered an engine failure early in the race. In China, Kobayashi was involved in a three-way collision with Buemi and Vitantonio Liuzzi on the first lap, making him the only driver to retire from the first four races. In Turkey, he won his first points of the season, coming home tenth after being promoted a place due to Vettel's retirement after a collision with teammate Webber and Petrov's puncture. In Valencia, he finished seventh by passing both Fernando Alonso and Sébastien Buemi in the final laps on fresh tyres, after driving the majority of the race in third position on his first set of tyres. He followed that with sixth place in Silverstone, eleventh in Germany, ninth in Hungary and eighth in Belgium.

Kobayashi's teammate changed in Singapore as Pedro de la Rosa was removed in favour of Nick Heidfeld. In Japan, Kobayashi qualified 14th and finished seventh, passing several drivers along the way including his teammate, in a very impressive fashion. He finished eighth in Korea and tenth in Brazil, eventually finishing the season with 32 points. In his review of the season, former TV commentator Murray Walker stated that Kobayashi is "without a doubt Japan's best [F1 driver] yet". Kobayashi gained a reputation during the season as a highly skilled overtaker, being able to outbrake drivers several car lengths in front of him. His aggressive overtaking style was described by Martin Brundle as, "He gets to the normal braking point and then goes, 'Now, which one is the brake again? That's right, it's on the left,' and he just sails past people!" He qualified well against his more experienced teammates, outqualifying de la Rosa and Heidfeld 11 times to 8 over the season.

2011

Kobayashi finished eighth in the season opening , but he and Pérez – who had finished seventh – were disqualified after the race due to an irregularity with the car's rear-wing. The next race of the season in Malaysia was another strong showing for Kobayashi, finishing eighth in the race, eventually classified seventh after Lewis Hamilton received a penalty. He finished tenth in his next three races, before a career-high fifth place in an incident-packed Monaco Grand Prix. In an extremely wet , Kobayashi worked his way up from 13th place to 2nd having not decided to change to extreme wet tyres before the race was red-flagged, as many other drivers had. This essentially gave him a free pit stop while the race was suspended. After the restart, the track began to dry out, and after changing to intermediate tyres and finally slicks, Kobayashi dropped several places, including having a spin whilst lapping a backmarker and being rear-ended by Nick Heidfeld. He eventually finished seventh, 0.045 seconds behind Felipe Massa, who passed him on the final straight.

2012

On 28 July 2011, it was announced that Kobayashi would remain with Sauber into the  season, alongside teammate Pérez.

He then started third at the  behind the Mercedes of Nico Rosberg and Michael Schumacher. He dropped to tenth but managed to set the fastest lap. At the  he finished fifth after overtaking Jenson Button and Nico Rosberg. Kobayashi finished in the points once in the next four races, finishing ninth in Canada. Kobayashi finished in a career-best fourth place at the  – having finished fifth on-the-road – as he was helped by a post-race penalty for second-placed Sebastian Vettel. Kobayashi was the only one of the five to continue in the race, and finished thirteenth.

Kobayashi became the first Japanese driver to finish on a Formula One podium in Japan in 22 years, after Aguri Suzuki in the 1990 Japanese Grand Prix, and was the third Japanese driver to finish on a Formula One podium after Suzuki and Takuma Sato in the 2004 United States Grand Prix.

On 23 November 2012, Sauber announced that Kobayashi would not be a part of the team's line-up for the  season, as Nico Hülkenberg and Esteban Gutiérrez would form the race team and Robin Frijns as reserve driver. Kobayashi ultimately finished the season in twelfth place in the Drivers' Championship, with 60 points. Despite raising around €8 million in sponsorship, Kobayashi elected to focus on gaining a competitive drive for the  season rather than a  drive.

FIA World Endurance Championship (2013)

AF Corse

On 11 March 2013 it was confirmed that Kobayashi would drive for AF Corse in the 2013 FIA World Endurance Championship season. He competed in the LMGTE-Pro class in the Ferrari 458 GT for what is expected to be all of the season's 8 rounds, including the 2013 24 Hours of Le Mans.

Kobayashi also tested a 2010 Formula One Ferrari in preparation for a promotional event in Moscow, where he crashed in the wet.

In the 81st edition of the 24 Hours of Le Mans 2013, Kobayashi and the AF Corse team scored fifth place in the GTE-Pro class along with his co-drivers Olivier Beretta and Toni Vilander, their Ferrari 458 GT covered a total of 312 laps in the Circuit de la Sarthe. The race was run in very difficult weather conditions and several serious accidents bringing out a record of twelve safety car caution periods.

Return to Formula One (2014)

Caterham (2014)

On 21 January 2014, it was confirmed that Kobayashi would return to Formula One with the Caterham F1 team for the 2014 season partnering Swedish driver Marcus Ericsson after considerable speculation about the team's all new line-up for the new season.
However, in the following , he was running as high as eighth, ahead of his teammate, the Marussias, and several other cars. He however finished the race in 13th, promoting Caterham to 10th in the Constructors' standings.

On 20 August 2014, it was announced that German driver André Lotterer would replace Kobayashi for the  race weekend. He returned to racing action at the  after Lotterer declined a further offer due to the seat being taken in practice by Roberto Merhi, who was attempting to qualify for an FIA Super Licence. Kobayashi declared his unhappiness at the situation, with the team's driver plans changing at short notice and his own future uncertain.

Super Formula (2015–)

Team LeMans (2015–2016)
On 30 January 2015, it was confirmed that Kobayashi would drive for Team LeMans in the 2015 Super Formula season. He scored three podiums on his way to a fifth-place finish in the drivers' championship during his first year in the series.

His second year with Team LeMans was less successful, only managing to score one point and finishing 17th in the championship.

KCMG (2017–)

Kobayashi moved to KCMG at the start of the 2017 season.

Return to FIA World Endurance Championship (2016–)

Toyota Gazoo Racing

On 4 February 2016, Kobayashi was confirmed as a LMP1 driver for Toyota Gazoo Racing in the FIA World Endurance Championship.

Kobayashi scored his first WEC race victory at the 2016 6 Hours of Fuji, finishing ahead of the No. 8 Audi and the No. 1 Porsche.

In 2017 he achieved the current lap record at the Circuit de la Sarthe with a lap time of 3:14.791.

Kobayashi won the 2021 24 Hours of Le Mans from pole after numerous attempts, alongside Mike Conway and Jose Maria Lopez. Kobayashi is the fourth Japanese driver to win the 24 Hours of Le Mans, the first being Masanori Sekiya, and is only the second to do so for a Japanese manufacturer.

In December 2021, Toyota announced that Kobayashi would succeed Hisatake Murata as team principal of the manufacturer's WEC programme, combining the management position with his role as a driver for the team.

Personal life
He was named after Kamuy, a divine being in Ainu mythology, and the letter of the name imitated the sound citing three Kanji from the sentence "Enabling great dream(s)".

In April 2013, he was awarded the Outstanding Achievement in Sport Award at The Asian Awards in London.

Racing record

Career summary

* Season still in progress.

Complete Formula 3 Euro Series record
(key) (Races in bold indicate pole position; races in italics indicate fastest lap)

Complete Macau Grand Prix results

Complete GP2 Series results
(key) (Races in bold indicate pole position; races in italics indicate fastest lap)

Complete GP2 Asia Series results
(key) (Races in bold indicate pole position; races in italics indicate fastest lap)

Complete Formula One results
(key) (Races in bold indicate pole position; races in italics indicate fastest lap)

 Did not finish the race, but was classified as he completed over 90% of the race distance.

Complete FIA World Endurance Championship results
(key) (Races in bold indicate pole position; races in italics indicate fastest lap)

Complete 24 Hours of Le Mans results

Complete Super Formula results
(key) (Races in bold indicate pole position; races in italics indicate fastest lap)

‡ Half points awarded as less than 75% of race distance was completed.

Complete Super GT results

Complete Formula E results
(key) (Races in bold indicate pole position; races in italics indicate fastest lap)

Complete IMSA SportsCar Championship results
(key) (Races in bold indicate pole position)

24 Hours of Daytona results

References

External links

  Kamui Kobayashi official website

1986 births
Living people
Japanese racing drivers
Japanese Formula One drivers
Toyota Formula One drivers
Sauber Formula One drivers
Caterham Formula One drivers
Super Formula drivers
GP2 Series drivers
GP2 Asia Series champions
Formula 3 Euro Series drivers
German Formula Renault 2.0 drivers
Dutch Formula Renault 2.0 drivers
Asian Formula Renault Challenge drivers
Formula Renault Eurocup drivers
Italian Formula Renault 2.0 drivers
Sportspeople from Amagasaki
GP2 Asia Series drivers
FIA World Endurance Championship drivers
24 Hours of Le Mans drivers
24 Hours of Le Mans winning drivers
24 Hours of Daytona drivers
Asian Le Mans Series drivers
Formula E drivers
WeatherTech SportsCar Championship drivers
Prema Powerteam drivers
ART Grand Prix drivers
DAMS drivers
AF Corse drivers
Team LeMans drivers
Toyota Gazoo Racing drivers
KCMG drivers
Action Express Racing drivers
Andretti Autosport drivers
Blancpain Endurance Series drivers
Super GT drivers
Wayne Taylor Racing drivers
Asia Racing Team drivers
BMW M drivers
Racing Bart Mampaey drivers
Mercedes-AMG Motorsport drivers